Roslyn is an unincorporated community in Abington Township, Montgomery County, Pennsylvania, United States. Originally called Hillside, the name Roslyn came from rose gardens that once grew there.

The first known person of European descent to settle the area was John Tyson, who bought a tract of land here in 1717. He built lime kilns to turn the abundant local limestone into quicklime, starting an industry that operated into the late 20th century.

The first rail connection to Roslyn was built by the Northeast Pennsylvania Railroad in 1873. Today's railroad station, which replaced the original in the late 1970s, is on SEPTA's Warminster Line. The location of the train station in Roslyn is at the intersection of Susquehanna Road and Easton Road.

The community is home to Roslyn Elementary School, one of the seven public elementary schools that make up Abington School District.  St. John of the Cross Elementary, a parochial school, closed in 2010, merging with Queen of Peace in neighboring Ardsley, PA forming Good Shepherd Catholic Regional Elementary School.

The headwaters for Sandy Run, a tributary of the Wissahickon Creek, are located in Roslyn.

Gallery

References

Unincorporated communities in Montgomery County, Pennsylvania
Unincorporated communities in Pennsylvania